Dawit Estifanos (born 27 February 1988) is an Ethiopian professional footballer who plays as a midfielder for Ethiopian Higher League club Jimma Aba Jifar.

Honours 
Ethiopian Coffee
Winner
 Ethiopian Premier League: 2010–11

Runner-up
 Ethiopian Premier League: 2013–14

External links 
 

1988 births
Living people
Ethiopian footballers
Ethiopia international footballers
Association football midfielders
Sportspeople from Oromia Region
2013 Africa Cup of Nations players